Michel Robidoux (10 July 1943 – 31 October 2021) was a Canadian musician.

Biography
Michel was the son of fellow musicians  and Jeanne Couët. He learned to play multiple musical instruments and played at the show  alongside Robert Charlebois, Yvon Deschamps, Louise Forestier, and Claudine Monfette. He also composed music on the Jean-Pierre Ferland album Jaune. He then arranged two songs on the Leonard Cohen album I'm Your Man. He was known for his contributions to the music on the children's television series Passe-Partout.

In March 2017, Robidoux released the album Robidoux Premier, which became a great success. It featured musicians such as Pierre Lapointe, Alex Nevsky, Bïa Krieger, Catherine Major, Ariane Moffatt, and Daniel Bélanger.

Michel Robidoux died on 31 October 2021, at the age of 78.

Distinctions
Félix Award (1982–2003)
Prix François-Cousineau of the Society of Composers, Authors and Music Publishers of Canada (2006)

References

External links
 
 

1943 births
2021 deaths
French Quebecers
20th-century Canadian male musicians
People from Estrie